"Little" Arthur King (February 23, 1927 — December 14, 2011) was a Canadian professional feather/light/welter/middleweight boxer of the 1940s and 1950s who won the Canadian lightweight title, and British Empire lightweight title. He was managed by Dave Yack (pre-1948), and Frank "Blinky" Palermo (1948-52), and struggled with his health for many years.

References

External links

Image - Arthur King
Image - Arthur King

1927 births
2011 deaths
Featherweight boxers
Lightweight boxers
Middleweight boxers
Place of death missing
Boxers from Toronto
Welterweight boxers
Canadian male boxers